Amanda Aziidah Ngabirano, is a Ugandan urban planner, urban planning consultant and academic, who serves as a lecturer and researcher in the Department of Architecture & Physical Planning, in the College of Engineering, Design, Art and Technology (CEDAT), at Makerere University, Uganda's oldest and largest public university.

She is also an outspoken promoter of bicycle transport in urban areas, touting that mode of transportation to "reduce noise and air pollution, lower transport costs, decongest urban centres, create more green spaces and achieve more inclusive mobility".

Background and education
She was born in Kasese Town, in the Western Region of Uganda in the 1970s.

After high school, she missed the government scholarship scheme and was unable to enter university because her parents could not afford the fees. She spent the next three years at a vocational school in Mbarara City, studying  Swahili. The teachers' college where she studied, Kakoba National Teacher’s College, is now a component of Bishop Stuart University, a private Christian university.

In her final year at Kakoba, she registered for the university entrance examinations again. The sat those A-Level examinations at St. Leo's College, Kyegobe, a Catholic, all-boys, boarding school in Fort Portal City. She passed and was admitted to Makerere University on government scholarship, to study urban planning, her only selection on the application. In 2002, she entered Makerere University, graduating three years later with a Bachelor of Urban Planning degree.

She graduated with a Master of Urban, Community and Regional Planning. As of October 2021, Amanda is pursuing a Doctorate degree in urban and regional planning through Saxion University of Applied Sciences.

Career
While an undergraduate at Makerere, she anchored the news in Kiswahili on Uganda Television (UTV), twice a week, at USh20,000 (approx. US$12 at that time), per session. She began lecturing at Makerere in 2006, on a part-time basis. She was appointed as a full-time lecturer in 2010.

She picked interest in bicycling as a mode of urban transportation, while pursuing her master's degree in Europe. She bought a bicycle and began cycling back and forth between her off-campus residence and the university. For the thesis of her master's degree, she selected "Integrating Bicycle Transport in City Planning: A Case Study of Kampala City". She carried out her research by interviewing bicyclists on the streets of Kampala.

An idea that she developed, which her supervisor at university thought was impractical, was accepted by the Kampala Capital City Authority (KCCA). A major road in the city was reserved for pedestrians, wheelchairs and bicyclist, blocking out motorized transport. The road is called Namirembe Road.

Family
She is a married mother of two children, one daughter born circa 2000 and one son born circa 2006.

Other considerations
In December 2021, she was appointed as the substantive Chairperson of the National Physical Planning Board- Uganda (NPPB). She had occupied the position in acting capacity from 4 July 2020.

She previously served as the vice president of the World Cycling Alliance. She is a member of the consultative forum to unite Ugandan taxi operators under a single organization. She is the African partner for Move Mobility, an organization based in Deventer, Netherlands. She is a member of Collaboration for Active Mobility in Africa (CAMA). She is the Ugandan coordinator for High Volume Transport Applied Research Programme.

See also
 Jennifer Musisi
 Judith Tukahirwa
 Gorretti Byomire

References

External links
 Personal Page of Amanda Aziidah Ngabirano
 Popular Makerere don Amanda Ngabirano tests positive for Coronavirus As of 23 August 2020.

Living people
1978 births
Ugandan urban planners
Ugandan women scientists
Makerere University alumni
People from Kasese District
Alumni of the University of Greenwich
Academic staff of Makerere University
People from Western Region, Uganda
Saxion University of Applied Sciences alumni